St Mary Magdalen Catholic Church is a Catholic parish in the Diocese of Westminster. Its parish church is located in Athenaeum Road, Whetstone, north London.

The church was built in 1958 and designed by Wilfrid Mangan.

References

External links

1958 in London
20th-century Roman Catholic church buildings in the United Kingdom
Churches in the London Borough of Barnet
Roman Catholic churches completed in 1958
Churches in the Roman Catholic Diocese of Westminster